The 2022 Tasmania SuperSprint (know for commercial purpose as the 2022 NED Whisky Tasmania Supersprint) was a motor racing event held as a part of the 2022 Supercars Championship from Saturday 26 March to Sunday 27 March 2022. The event was held at the Symmons Plains Raceway in Launceston, Tasmania. It was the second round of the 2022 Supercars Championship and consisted of three races of 106.040 kilometres each.

Results

Race 1

Race 2

Race 3

Championship standings after the race

Drivers' Championship standings

Teams Championship standings

 Note: Only the top five positions are included for standings.

References

Tasmania SuperNight
Tasmania SuperNight